Barton Chapel Congregational Church is a historic church in Robbins, Tennessee. The church building on U.S. Highway 27, built in 1926, was added to the National Register of Historic Places in 1984.

The Congregational church in Robbins was established in 1885 as the Pilgrim Church. It was renamed Barton Chapel in honor of its first minister, William E. Barton. After attending Berea College, he spent two years as a circuit-riding preacher serving the church in Robbins as well as churches in Glenmary, Deer Lodge and Lancing. He left Robbins to continue his education at a seminary in Ohio. After finishing at the seminary, he went on to serve the First Congregational Church in Oak Park, Illinois, as its pastor for 25 years. He left Illinois to finish his career as a member of the faculty of the School of Religion at Vanderbilt University in Nashville. When the Congregational church in Robbins built a new building in 1926, the building was dedicated to Barton, who attended the cornerstone-laying ceremony.

The church is built from brick produced in Robbins, which was a center for brickmaking. The brick for the church was donated by the Southern Clay Manufacturing Company; the church walls were laid three bricks thick. Interior furnishings in the church include a podium and two altar chairs from Barton's church in Oak Park, pews donated by the women of the Oak Park church, and light fixtures donated by a friend of the Barton family.

References

Churches on the National Register of Historic Places in Tennessee
Gothic Revival church buildings in Tennessee
Churches completed in 1926
20th-century churches in the United States
Buildings and structures in Scott County, Tennessee
National Register of Historic Places in Scott County, Tennessee
Congregational churches in Tennessee
1926 establishments in Tennessee